The following is a comprehensive list of awards received by Enrique Iglesias, a Spanish pop singer, songwriter, and actor widely regarded as " The King Of Latin Pop " . To date Iglesias has sold over 180 million records, making him one of the best selling Latin recording artists of all time. Iglesias has received 190 awards from 526 nominations and was crowned as Billboard's " Top Latin Artist Of All Time " for his many achievements, popularity, and contributions to the Latin Music charts .

ACE Awards

|-
|1996
|rowspan=2|Enrique Iglesias
|Vocalist of the Year
| rowspan=2 
|-
|1997
|Performer of the Year
|-
|}

ALMA Awards
 
  
|-
|1999
|American Music Awards
|Outstanding Performance by an Individual in a Music series
| 
|-
|2000
|"Bailamos"
|Outstanding Music Video Performer
|
|-
|rowspan=3|2002
|Escape
|Album of the Year
|rowspan=5 
|-
|"Hero"
|People's Choice : Best Music Video
|-
|rowspan=3|Enrique Iglesias
|Best Male Artist in Music
|-
|2009
|Best of the Year in Music
|-
|2011
|Best Male Artist in Music
|}

American Music Awards

!
|-
|
|rowspan=14|Enrique Iglesias
|rowspan=6|Favorite Latin Artist
| 
|
|-
|
|
|
|-
|
|
|-
|
|rowspan=3 
|-
|
|-
|rowspan=3|2003
|-
|Favorite Pop/Rock Male Artist
|rowspan=2 
|-
|Fans Choice Award
|-
|
|rowspan=6|Favorite Latin Artist
|
|-
|
|rowspan=2 
|-
|
|-
|
|rowspan=3 
|-
|
|-
|
|}

Latin American Music Awards
The Latin American Music Awards (Latin AMAS) is an annual award presented by American television network Telemundo. It is the Spanish-language counterpart of the American Music Awards produced by the Dick Clark Productions.

Billboard Music Video Awards

Blockbuster Entertainment Awards 

|-
|rowspan=2|2000
|Enrique Iglesias
|Favorite Latino Artist
|
|-
|"Bailamos"
|Favorite Song From A Movie  from (Wild Wild West)
|rowspan=2 
|-
|2001
|Enrique Iglesias
|Favorite Pop Artist – Male
|}

BMI Awards
Broadcast Music, Inc. (BMI) is one of three United States performing rights organizations, along with ASCAP and SESAC. It collects license fees on behalf of songwriters, composers, and music publishers and distributes them as royalties to those members whose works have been performed.

BMI Latin Awards

CCTV-MTV Music Honors

|-
|2000
|Enrique Iglesias
|International Male Artist of the Year
|
|}

Canadian Fannie Awards

|-
|rowspan=2|Enrique Iglesias
|Enrique Iglesias
|Favorite Male Artist
|rowspan=2 
|-
|"Hero"
|Favorite Video
|-
|}

Comet Awards

|-
|Enrique Iglesias
|"Hero"
|Best Male Video
|
|}

ECHO Awards 

|-
|2001
|rowspan=2|Enrique Iglesias
|rowspan=2|Best International Male Artist
|rowspan=2 
|-
|2003
|}

Ev.gerard Video Music Awards

|-
|rowspan=2|Enrique Iglesias
|"Dirty Dancer" (ft. Usher & Lil Wayne)
|Best Male Video
|
|-
|"Tonight (I'm Lovin' You)" (ft. Ludacris & DJ Frank E)
|Best Latin Video
|
|}

The Record of the Year Award 

|-
|2002
|"Hero"
|Record of the Year
|
|-
|}

Grammy Awards
The Grammy Awards are awarded annually by the National Academy of Recording Arts and Sciences in the United States.

Ivor Novello Awards

|-
|2003
|"Hero"
|Best Selling UK Single
|
|-
|}

Much Music Video Awards

|-
|2000
|"Be With You"
|People's Choice: Favourite International Video
|
|}

Premio Lo Nuestro

|-
|rowspan=5|1996
|rowspan=2|Enrique Iglesias
|Pop Best New Artist
|
|-
|Pop Male Artist
|
|-
|"Si Tú Te Vas"
|Pop Song of the Year
|rowspan=2 
|-
|Enrique Iglesias
|Pop Album of the Year
|-
|"Experiencia Religiosa"
|Video of the Year
|
|-
|rowspan=4|1997
|Vivir
|Pop Album of the Year
|rowspan=2 
|-
|"Experiencia Religiosa"
|Pop Song of the Year
|-
|"Por Amarte"
|Pop Song of the Year
|
|-
|rowspan=2|Enrique Iglesias
|Pop Male Artist
|
|-
|1998
|Pop Male Artist
|rowspan=3 
|-
|rowspan=3|1999
|Cosas del Amor
|Pop Album of the Year
|-
|Enrique Iglesias
|Pop Male Artist
|-
|"Esperanza"
|Video of the Year
|
|-
|rowspan=2|2000
|Bailamos
|Pop Album of the Year
|rowspan=2 
|-
|"Bailamos"
|Pop Song of the Year
|-
|2002
|"Hero"
|Video of the Year
|
|-
|rowspan=4|2003
|rowspan=2|Enrique Iglesias
|Pop Male Artist of the Year
|rowspan=7 
|-
|People's Internet Award
|-
|Quizás
|Album of the Year
|-
|"Mentiroso"
|Video of the Year
|-
|rowspan=3|2008
|Enrique Iglesias
|Pop Male Artist of the Year
|-
|rowspan=2|Dimelo?"
|Pop Song of the Year
|-
|Video of The Year
|-
|rowspan=3|2009
|"95/08 Éxitos"
|Pop Album of the Year
|rowspan=2 
|-
|¿Dónde Están Corazón?
|Pop Song of the Year
|-
|rowspan=3|Enrique Iglesias
|Pop Male Artist of the Year
|rowspan=2 
|-
|2010
|Pop Male Artist of the Year
|-
|rowspan=5|2011
|Pop Male Artist of the Year
| 
|-
|Euphoria
|Pop Album of the Year
|rowspan=2 
|-
|"Gracias a Ti"  (with Wisin & Yandel)
|Collaboration of the Year
|-
|rowspan=2|"Cuando Me Enamoro"  (ft. Juan Luis Guerra)
|Collaboration of the Year
| 
|-
|Pop Song of the Year
|
|-
|2012
|rowspan=3|Enrique Iglesias
|Pop Male Artist of the Year
|
|-
|rowspan=10|2015
|Artist of the Year
|
|-
|Pop Male Artist of the Year
|rowspan=4 
|-
|rowspan=2|"Loco" (ft. Romeo Santos)
|Tropical Song of the Year
|-
|Tropical Collaboration of the Year
|-
|rowspan=3|"Bailando"  (ft. Descemer Bueno and Gente de Zona)
|Pop Song of the Year
|-
|Pop Collaboration of the Year
|
|-
|Video of the Year
|rowspan=2 
|-
|"Sex & Love"
|Pop Album of the Year
|-
|rowspan=2|"El Perdedor"  (ft. Marco Antonio Solís)
|Pop Song of the Year
|rowspan=3 
|-
|Pop Collaboration of the Year
|-
|rowspan=4|2016
|rowspan=2|Enrique Iglesias
|Artist of the Year
|-
|Pop Male Artist of the Year
|rowspan=3 
|-
|rowspan=2|"El Perdón"(with Nicky Jam]
|Collaboration of the Year
|-
|Urban Song of the Year
|-
|rowspan=5|2019
|rowspan=3|"El Baño (Remix)" (with Bad Bunny and Natti Natasha)
|Remix of the Year
|rowspan=3 
|-
|Urban Song of the Year
|-
|Urban Collaboration of the Year
|-
|"Por Amarte"
|Replay Song of the Year
|
|-
|"Nos Fuimos Lejos" (with Descemer Bueno and El Micha)
|Pop/Rock Collaboration of the Year
|
|}

Premios Eres

|-
|rowspan=3|1996
|rowspan=2|"Si Tú Te Vas"
|Best Song
|rowspan=3 
|-
|Best Video
|-
|Enrique Iglesias
|Best Launch
|}

Premios Juventud

|-
|rowspan=4|2004
|Cosas del Amor
|CD To Die For
|rowspan=5 
|-
|rowspan=8|Enrique Iglesias
|He's Got Style
|-
|He's So Hot!
|-
|All Over the Dial
|-
|rowspan=4|2008
|Red Hot Artist
|-
|My Favorite Concert  with Aventura
|
|-
|Favorite Pop Star
|rowspan=6 
|-
|What a Hottie!
|-
|rowspan=3|2009 
|Favorite Pop Artist
|-
|"Lloro Por Ti" (ft. Wisin & Yandel)
|The Perfect Combo
|-
|"¿Dónde Están Corazón?"
|Best Ballad
|-
|rowspan=6|2011
|Enrique Iglesias
|My Pop Artist
|-
|"Cuando Me Enamoro" (ft. Juan Luis Guerra)
|rowspan=3|The Perfect Combo
|
|-
|"I Like It" (ft. Pitbull)
|rowspan=4 
|-
|"No Me Digas Que No" (ft. Wisin & Yandel)
|-
|rowspan=3|Euphoria
|Just Play It All
|-
|The Super Tour
|-
|rowspan=3|2012
|The Super Tour
|
|-
|"Cuando Me Enamoro]" (ft. Juan Luis Guerra)
|Best Novela Theme
|rowspan=2 
|-
|rowspan=3|Enrique Iglesias
|My Pop Artist
|-
|rowspan=7|2014
|Special Award:  Supernova
|rowspan=5 
|-
|Favourite Hispanic Pop/Rock Artist
|-
|rowspan=3|"El Perdedor"  (ft.Marco Antonio Solís)
|Best Theme Novelero
|-
|Best Ballad
|-
|The Perfect Combo
|-
|"Loco"  (ft. Romeo Santos)
|The Perfect Combo
|
|-
|rowspan=5|"Bailando" (ft. Gente de Zona & Descemer Bueno)
|My Favourite Lyrics
|rowspan=5 
|-
|rowspan=9|2015
|My Favourite Catchiest Song
|-
|My Favourite Music Video
|-
|My Favourite Ringtone
|-
|The Perfect Combo
|-
|rowspan=2|"El Perdón" (with Nicky Jam)
|The Perfect Combo
|rowspan=3 
|-
|My Favourite Catchiest Tune
|-
|"Sex + Love"
|Your Favourite CD
|-
|Sex & Love Tour
|The Super Tour
|rowspan=2 
|-
|rowspan=2|Enrique Iglesias
|My Pop Artist
|-
| 2016
| Mi Tuitero Favorito
| 
|-
|}

Premios Tu Mundo 

|-
|rowspan=2|2014
|"Bailando" 
|Start – Party Song
|rowspan=4 
|-
|rowspan=2|Enrique Iglesias
|Favourite Pop Artist
|-
|rowspan=2|2015
|Favourite Pop Artist
|-
|"El Perdón"  (ft. Nicky Jam)
|rowspan=2|Start – Party Song
|-
|2016
|"Duele el Corazón"  (ft. Wisin)
|
|}

National Music Awards 

|-
|2002
|Escape
|Favorite Album
| 
|}

Juno Awards

|-
|2001
|Enrique
|rowspan=2|International Album of the Year
|rowspan=2 
|-
|2003
|Escape
|}

Meteor Music Awards 

|-
|2002
|Enrique Iglesias
|Best Male Artist
|
|}

MTV Awards

MTV Asia Awards (Asia)

|-
|2003
|rowspan=2|Enrique Iglesias
|rowspan=2|Favorite International Male Artist
|rowspan=2 
|-
|2005
|-
|}

MTV Europe Music Awards 

|-
|2000
|Enrique Iglesias
|Best Spanish Act
|rowspan=5 
|-
|rowspan=4|2002
|"Hero"
|Best Song
|-
|rowspan=10|Enrique Iglesias
|Best Male
|-
|Best Pop
|-
|Best Spanish Act
|-
|rowspan=3|2010
|Best Spanish Act
| 
|-
|Best Male Artist
|rowspan=3 
|-
|Best European Act
|-
|2011
|rowspan=2|Best World Stage Performance
|-
|rowspan=3|2014
|
|-
|Best Southern European Act
|
|-
|Best Spanish Act
|
|}

MTV India Awards 

|-
|2004
|Enrique Iglesias
|Best Male Pop Act International
| 
|}

Los Premios MTV Latinoamérica 

|-
|rowspan=3|2002 
|"Héroe"
| Video of the Year
| 
|-
|rowspan=3|Enrique Iglesias
| Best Male Artist
|rowspan=4 
|-
| Best Pop Artist
|-
|rowspan=2|2007 
|MTV Tr3́s Viewer's Choice – Best Pop Artist
|-
|"Dímelo"
| Song of the Year
|}

MTV Video Music Awards 

|-
|rowspan=5|2002
|rowspan=2|"Hero"
|Best Male Video
|rowspan=7 
|-
|Viewer's Choice
|-
|rowspan=2|"Héroe"
|International Viewer's Choice – MTV Latin America (North) 
|-
|International Viewer's Choice – MTV Latin America (Pacific) 
|-
|"Escapar"
|International Viewer's Choice – MTV Latin America (Atlantic)  
|-
|2010
|"I Like It" (Jersey Shore version)  (ft. Pitbull)
|Best Dance Music Video
|-
|2011
|"Tonight (I'm Lovin' You)"  (ft. Ludacris & DJ Frank E)
|Best Latino Artist
|}

Music Television Awards

People's Choice Awards

|-
|2011
|rowspan=2|Enrique Iglesias
|rowspan=2|Favorite Male Artist
| rowspan=2 
|-
|2012
|-
|}

Pollstar Awards

Premio Orgullasamente 

|-
|rowspan=3|2009
|Enrique Iglesias
|Latin Artist of the Year
|rowspan=3 
|-
|rowspan=2|"Lloro Por Ti" (ft. Wisin & Yandel)
|Latin Song of the Year
|-
|Latin Video of the Year
|-
|rowspan=3|2010
|Enrique Iglesias
|Latin Artist of the Year
| 
|-
|rowspan=2|"Cuando Me Enamoro"  (ft. Juan Luis Guerra)
|Latin Song of the Year
|
|-
|Latin Video of the Year
| 
|}

Premios 40 Principales

Premios 40 Principales España

|-
|2010
|Enrique Iglesias
|Best Spanish Solo Act
|rowspan=3 
|-
|rowspan=5|2011

|rowspan=3|"Tonight (I'm Lovin' You)" (ft. Ludacris and DJ Frank E)
|Best Spanish Dance-Pop Project
|-
|Best Song
|-
|Best Spanish video
|
|-
|rowspan=3|Enrique Iglesias
|Best Spanish Act
|
|-
|Most Influential Spanish Artist (Special award)
|
|-
|rowspan=4|2014
|Best Spanish Act
|rowspan=2 
|-
|rowspan=2|"Bailando" (ft. Descemer Bueno & Gente de Zona)
|Best Spanish Song
|-
|Best Spanish Video
|rowspan=2 
|-
|"Sex + Love"
|Best Spanish Album
|-
|2015
|rowspan=2|Enrique Iglesias
|Best Spanish Act
|rowspan=5 
|-
|rowspan=4|2016
|Artist of the Year
|-
|rowspan=3|"Duele el Corazón"  (ft. Wisin)
|Song of the Year
|-
|Video of the Year
|-
|Global Show Award
|}

Premios 40 Principales América

|-
|rowspan=3|2014
|Enrique Iglesias
|Best Spanish Language Act
|
|-
|"Sex + Love"
|Best Spanish Language Album
|rowspan=2 
|-
|"Bailando" 
|Best Spanish Language Song
|}

Neox Fan Awards 

|-
|2014
|"Bailando"
|Best song of the year
|
|}

Urban Music Award 

|-
|2009
|Enrique Iglesias
|Best International Latino Act
| 
|}

Ritmo Latino Music Awards 

|-
| rowspan=3|1999
| "Cosas del Amor (Enrique Iglesias album)|Cosas del Amor"
| Album of the Year
| 
|-
| "Esperanza"
| Song of the Year
| 
|-
| rowspan=2|"Enrique Iglesias"
| Best Male Artist
|rowspan=4 
|-
| rowspan=2|2001
| Best Male Artist
|-
| "Enrique"
| Album of the Year
|-
| 2002
| "Escape"
| Music Video of the Year
|-
|}

TMF Awards 

|-
|2007
|"Do You Know?"
|Best International Video 
|
|}

Radio Regenbogen Awards 

|-
|2007
|Enrique Iglesias
|Best International Artist
|
|}

Los Premios Telehit Awards 

|-
|2008
|Enrique Iglesias
|Pop Artist of the Year
| rowspan=4 
|-
|2010
| Enrique Iglesias: 95/08 Éxitos|95/08 Éxitos
|International Album of the Year
|-
|2011
|rowspan=2|Enrique Iglesias
|rowspan=2|Pop Artist of the Year
|-
|2012
|}

Premios Fuse TV Awards 

|-
|2011
|"Ayer"
|Best Male Video
|
|-
|}

Premio Ondas 

!
|-
|2002
|Enrique Iglesias
|Most Successful Spanish Artist of the Decade
| 
|
|}

Premios Oye! 

|-
|rowspan=3|2010
|rowspan=2|"Cuando Me Enamoro"  (ft. Juan Luis Guerra)
|Spanish Record of the Year
| 
|-
|Spanish Theme of the Year
| 
|-
|Euphoria|Best Pop Male Album
|
|}

 Top of the Pops Awards 

|-
|rowspan=2|2002
|"Hero"
| Top Song
|rowspan=2 
|-
| One Night Stand – World Tour
|Top Tour 
|}

 Univision's Best of Music 

|-
|rowspan=4|2011
|Euphoria|Best Disc
|
|-
|Euphoria Tour''
|Best Tour
|rowspan=2 
|-
|"No Me Digas Que No" (ft. Wisin & Yandel)
|Best Song
|-
|"Tonight (I'm Lovin' You" (ft. Ludacris and DJ Frank E)
|Best Video
|
|-
|}

Valentine's Day Awards 

|-
|rowspan=2|2012
|Enrique Iglesias
|Most Desirable Man
|rowspan=2 
|-
|"Love To See You Cry"
|Best Love Song of the Year
|-
|}

VH1/Vogue Fashion Awards

!
|-
|2000
|Enrique Iglesias
|Most Fashionable Artist – Male
|
|
|}

Viña Del Mar International Song Festival

|-
|2000
|Enrique Iglesias
|Gaviota De Plata
|
|-
|}

World Music Awards 

|-
|rowspan=2|1996
|rowspan=10|Enrique Iglesias
|Hispanic Artist of the Year
|rowspan=5 
|-
|Revelacion of the Year
|-
|rowspan=3|2002
|Best Seling Pop Male Artist
|-
|Best Selling European Artist
|-
|Best Selling Latin Male Artist
|-
|rowspan=3|2008
|Best Pop/Rock Male Artist
| 
|-
|Best Selling Latin Performer
|rowspan=5 
|-
|Best Selling Spanish Artist
|-
|rowspan=3|2012
|Best Male Artist
|-
|Best Entertainer of the Year
|-
|"Finally Found You"
|Best Song
|-
|2014 
|"Heart Attack"
| World's Best Song
|
|}

Billboard Decade-End

Billboard legacy 

 Artist of The Year Chart in: 2000, 2001, 2002, 2010, 2011, 2014.
 Billboard 200 Albums Of The Year Charts in: 1999,2000, 2001, 2002, 2010, 2014
 Billboard Hot 100 Songs Of The Year Charts in: 1999, 2000, 2001, 2002, 2007, 2010, 2011, 2012, 2014, 2015

Other recognition 

 Para Todos : King of Latin Pop
 Para Todos : King of Dance
 Appeared on more than 300 magazine covers
 Holds the record for male artist with the most No. 1 Songs on the "Billboard Dance Charts", edging out Michael Jackson as the "King of Dance"
 Biggest selling international artist of all time in India
 United kingdom's biggest selling Latin artist of all time 
 Enrique is the artist with most No. 1 hits on the "Hot Latin Songs Chart"
 Enrique is the first ever artist in the industry whose Latin video (BAILANDO) Churned Out over 1 Billion + views
 ENRIQUE IGLESIAS Was named the "King of 2014" .
 ENRIQUE Was named the "Crowd Pleaser of 2014" by "Billboard" due to his success with the 10th studio album and huge hit "Bailando"
 Enrique has 36 Latin Billboard awards which is the most for any artist. 
 Bailando was the tenth best selling song in the world of 2014 with 8M sold worldwide
 "Sex And Love" was Spotify's 7th most listened to album worldwide of 2014
 Enrique's Pepsi commercial with P!nk, Britney Spears, and Beyoncé was named the No. 1 Super Bowl commercial of all time
 Enrique's first Spanish album, "Enrique Iglesias", sold 1M copies in the US after three months and won a Grammy
Enrique is an honorary recipient of one "Guinness World Records" , Namely, 
 He's the artist who has most number one singles on "Hot Latin Songs" Billboard Chart dated since – 1995 to 2015 .

References

Iglesias, Enrique
Awards